Ystrad Rhondda Rugby Football Club is a Welsh rugby union team based in Ystrad in the Rhondda Valley. Ystrad Rhondda RFC play home games in royal and blue hooped shirts with black shorts and black socks. Today, Ystrad Rhondda RFC plays in the Welsh Rugby Union [[WRU Championship league and are a feeder club for Cardiff Blues.

Club honours
1994-95 Welsh League Division 6 Central - Champions
2004-05 WRU Division Two East Champions
2007-08 WRU Division Two East Champions
2011-12 WRU Division Two East Champions
2013-2014 Mid district finalists
2014-2015 Swalec plate winners
2014-2015 Glamorgan County Silver Ball finalists

Notable players
  Mike Griffiths 38 Wales caps, 1989 British Lion
  Willie Llewellyn (20 caps)

References

Rugby clubs established in 1880
Welsh rugby union teams